Bob and Mike Bryan successfully defended their title beating Max Mirnyi and Daniel Nestor 6–2, 6–3 in the final.

Seeds
All seeds received a bye into the second round.

Draw

Finals

Top half

Bottom half

References
 Main Draw

Monte-Carlo Rolex Masters - Doubles
2012 Monte-Carlo Rolex Masters